Matthew Maurice Doocey (born 1972) is a New Zealand politician who was elected to the New Zealand Parliament at the 2014 general election as a representative of the New Zealand National Party. He was re-elected in 2017 with a majority increase of over 10,000 which was a significant increase from a majority of 2,500 in 2014. It was reported that this was the largest personal vote increase in the country.

Personal life
Doocey is a member of the well-known Carter family. Family patriarch Maurice Carter, a Christchurch City Councillor for over 30 years (1956–1989), was his grandfather, and the former Speaker of the House of Representatives, David Carter, is his uncle. Doocey grew up in Christchurch and attended St Bede's College for his secondary schooling. The Dooceys bought their current home in Rangiora, which currently falls into the Waimakariri electorate, in April 2014 after boundary changes put his former Redwood home out of the electorate.

Political career

Doocey stood in the 2013 Christchurch East by-election placing second behind Poto Williams. At the time, Doocey was a manager for the Canterbury District Health Board. The party's Canterbury Westland Regional Chair, Roger Bridge, noted that a sitting government has never won a by-election in an electorate that it did not already hold. Bridge later conceded that it would be "very, very hard for us to win". When Kate Wilkinson, National MP for the  electorate, announced in early November 2013 that she would retire at the end of the term of the 50th Parliament, rumours immediately surfaced that Doocey is going to replace her as the candidate in the Waimakariri electorate, and the Christchurch East by-election was for him to gain experience in contesting an election.

In government, 2014–2017
Doocey left his job in June 2014 to focus on the Waimakariri election campaign.

For the 51st New Zealand Parliament Doocey was appointed Deputy Chair of the Social Services Select Committee. In 2016 he brought a cross-party delegation of the Social Services Select Committee to Canterbury to hear from service providers about their response to communities’ psycho-social recovery needs in post-earthquake Canterbury. Also in his first term, Doocey was appointed the third Whip of the National Government.

During the 2017 general election, Doocey retained his seat in Waimakariri by a margin of 10,766 votes.

In opposition, 2017–present

For the 52nd New Zealand Parliament, Doocey served as National's Junior Whip, working closely with the Party's Senior Whip. He was also appointed Spokesperson for Mental Health and is National's Associate Spokesperson for Health, and  a member of the Health Select Committee.

As National's first Spokesperson for Mental Health, in 2018, Doocey wrote to every political party in Parliament to invite them to join a cross-party approach to mental health that would focus on developing solutions and policy over a longer period than the Parliamentary three-year term. Doocey believed that by initiating a bipartisan approach to mental health this would break down some of the barriers to progress to improve mental health outcomes in New Zealand. However, Labour and the Greens rejected National's offer for a cross-party approach to mental health.

On 28 August 2019, John Kirwan launched the Mental Health and Addictions Wellbeing cross-party group, with the executive consisting of Matt Doocey, Louisa Wall (Labour), Chlöe Swarbrick (Green Party), Jenny Marcroft (New Zealand First) and David Seymour (ACT), to work together to improve mental health and wellbeing in New Zealand.

During the 2020 general election, Doocey retained Waimakariri for the National Party by a final margin of 1,507 votes. Following the election, the National caucus elected him as its Senior Whip on 10 November. He served in this role until December 2021, when he joined the National Party front bench under the new leader Christopher Luxon.

Previous life
Born and bred in Canterbury, New Zealand, Doocey worked in mental health and healthcare management in both New Zealand and the UK. He studied Counselling Psychology at Weltech, has a BSc (Hons) in Social Policy, an MA in Healthcare Management from Kingston University in London and an MSc in Global Politics from Birkbeck, University of London.

References

Living people
New Zealand National Party MPs
Members of the New Zealand House of Representatives
People educated at St Bede's College, Christchurch
New Zealand MPs for Christchurch electorates
21st-century New Zealand politicians
Candidates in the 2017 New Zealand general election
1972 births